Peninsula is a village in Summit County, Ohio, United States. The population was 565 at the 2010 census. It is part of the Akron Metropolitan Statistical Area.

Peninsula is in the middle of the Cuyahoga Valley National Park, which provides a source of tourism to the village. Blossom Music Center is located on its outskirts.  The Ohio and Erie Canal Towpath Trail runs through just west of downtown, and many bikers and hikers stop for refreshments because it is one of the few towns between Akron and Cleveland.

Peninsula is bordered on the east by Boston Heights.  It is a part of Boston Township.

More than 20 places in Peninsula are listed on the National Register of Historic Places.

History

Settled in 1818, Peninsula, on the Cuyahoga River halfway between Cleveland and Akron, is a well-preserved mid-19th-century town that grew and prospered with the establishment of the Ohio and Erie Canal and the Valley Railroad. The village was plotted in 1837 by Herman Bronson. Peninsula was a bustling canal boat stop and home to several mills, stone quarries and boat yards, five hotels and 14 bars until 1887. The Gothic Revival Bronson Memorial Church, originally constructed in 1835 as the Bethel Church, according to William Perrin's History of Summit County (1881) was an attempt to “introduce moral and religious tactics among the vicious and unlawful practices of the canal boatmen.” In 1889 the church was remodeled in the Gothic Revival style. The historic district extends along Main Street and contains many fine examples of early 19th-century architecture. The dominant Greek Revival style reflects popular architectural tastes at the time the area was settled by New Englanders. A notable high style example of the village's Greek Revival architecture is the 1824 Bronson House, built of locally quarried sandstone blocks. Several canal-era houses are typical of the popular Western Reserve New England building type called the Upright-and-Wing, particularly suitable for the early 19th-century Ohio frontier. The main gable-front two-story section contained a parlor and bedchambers, while the kitchen was located in a perpendicular one-story eave oriented section. Other architectural styles include Gothic Revival, Italianate, Queen Anne, Stick and Colonial Revival. The 1886 Stick-style Boston Township Hall originally functioned as the village high school. The three-story hip-roofed building contains a pyramidal roof tower with an open belfry. The Township Hall is now the Cuyahoga Valley Historical Museum.

Geography
Peninsula is located at  (41.240755, -81.556363).

Boston Mills/Brandywine Ski Resort just north of Peninsula is one of the few skiing locations in Ohio.

Demographics

2010 census
As of the census of 2010, there were 565 people, 237 households, and 164 families living in the village. The racial makeup of the village was 98.4% White, 0.4% African American, 0.4% Asian, and 0.9% from two or more races. Hispanic or Latino of any race were 0.4% of the population.

There were 237 households, of which 26.2% had children under the age of 18 living with them, 55.3% were married couples living together, 11.0% had a female householder with no husband present, 3.0% had a male householder with no wife present, and 30.8% were non-families. 25.3% of all households were made up of individuals, and 6.7% had someone living alone who was 65 years of age or older. The average household size was 2.38 and the average family size was 2.84.

The median age in the village was 47.3 years. 20.5% of residents were under the age of 18; 5.7% were between the ages of 18 and 24; 19.4% were from 25 to 44; 40.9% were from 45 to 64; and 13.5% were 65 years of age or older. The gender makeup of the village was 49.4% male and 50.6% female.

2000 census
As of the census of 2000, there were 602 people, 240 households, and 160 families living in the village. The population density was 128.8 people per square mile (49.8/km). There were 254 housing units at an average density of 54.3 per square mile (21.0/km). The racial makeup of the village was 97.84% White, 0.66% African American, 0.33% Asian, 0.17% from other races, and 1.00% from two or more races. Hispanic or Latino of any race were 0.17% of the population.

There were 240 households, out of which 25.0% had children under the age of 18 living with them, 56.3% were married couples living together, 8.3% had a female householder with no husband present, and 33.3% were non-families. 25.0% of all households were made up of individuals, and 7.5% had someone living alone who was 65 years of age or older. The average household size was 2.40 and the average family size was 2.91.

In the village, the population was spread out, with 20.9% under the age of 18, 4.5% from 18 to 24, 29.1% from 25 to 44, 30.7% from 45 to 64, and 14.8% who were 65 years of age or older. The median age was 43 years. For every 100 females, there were 98.7 males. For every 100 females age 18 and over, there were 93.5 males.

The median income for a household in the village was $64,205, and the median income for a family was $73,125. Males had a median income of $48,125 versus $27,188 for females. The per capita income for the village was $29,031. None of the families and 1.2% of the population were living below the poverty line, including no under eighteens and 2.2% of those over 64.

Education
Public schooling is provided by the Woodridge Local School District.

See also
 List of Registered Historic Places in Summit County, Ohio

References

External links
Village website

 
Villages in Summit County, Ohio
Villages in Ohio
Populated places established in 1818
1818 establishments in Ohio